Geleh Deh or Gelleh Deh may refer to:
 Geleh Deh Kuh
 Geleh Deh Rud